Anthurium plantagineum is a species of plant in the family Araceae. It is endemic to Ecuador.  Its natural habitat is subtropical or tropical moist lowland forests. It is threatened by habitat loss.

The Latin specific epithet plantagineum refers to the leaves of the plant which are similar to those of a plantain.

References

Endemic flora of Ecuador
plantagineum
Data deficient plants
Taxonomy articles created by Polbot